Fabiano Scherner (born June 30, 1972) is a German-Brazilian professional mixed martial artist and Brazilian jiu-jitsu black belt. He has fought in Cage Rage, IFL and the Ultimate Fighting Championship. Scherner is a Brazilian Jiu-Jitsu competitor who won multiple championships on an international and world stage in senior and master divisions, although not in the adult divisions.

Background
Scherner was born in Tres Passos on June 30, 1972. In 1999, Scherner started training Brazilian Jiu-Jitsu in Brazil with Carlson Gracie student Murilo Rupp. There he was introduced to Mario Sperry, Murilo Bustamante, and Luis Roberto "Bebeo" Duarte. Bebeo was one of the founding members of the Brazilian Top Team (BTT) academy and invited Scherner to train with BTT.

Scherner received his black belt in a very fast three years and nine months. Shortly following this, Ricardo Liborio invited Scherner to start training MMA and teaching BJJ in Olympia, Washington. While in Olympia, Scherner began cross-training with fellow heavyweight Jeff Monson, as he worked to develop his MMA skills.

Mixed martial arts career

Ultimate Fighting Championship

Scherner made his UFC debut against Brandon Vera, losing via TKO (knees & punches) in the second round.

In his second fight in the UFC, Scherner fought Gabriel Gonzaga, losing via TKO (Punches) in the second round. Following the loss, Scherner was released from the UFC.

IFL
After leaving the UFC, Scherner fought against Gilbert Yvel at Cage Rage 17 - Ultimate Challenge losing via TKO (Punches) in the first round. Scherner then fought in three other organizations in Brazil Before fighting in the IFL, racking up 2 wins and 1 no contest.

In 2008, Scherner fought Roy Nelson for the IFL Heavyweight Championship at IFL – Las Vegas losing via TKO (Punches) in the first round.

Post-IFL
Scherner returned to action four months later against Journeyman Mychal Clark who submitted Scherner with punches from a mounted position.

Scherner then fought Tracy Willis, and was knocked down by an overhand right early in the second round. Willis followed up with hammerfists that opened a cut on Scherner's forehead and prompted referee Josh Rosenthal to stop the fight.

Scherner fought Nick Braker on June 6, 2009, at Carnage at the Creek 6 winning via Submission (Rear-Naked Choke) at 3:08 of the first round.

Scherner lost his next fight against heavyweight prospect Mike Hayes via KO (Punch) at 3:50 of round 2.

Scherner fought Scott Junk at Galaxy MMA 1 – Worlds Collide, During the fight Scherner landed an unintentional low blow on Junk that dropped the Heavyweight to his knees. Junk laid on the cage floor for several minutes before he informed the ringside doctors he could no long continue. The fight was ruled a no contest with the official end coming just 27 seconds into round one.

Scherner was scheduled to fight fellow UFC veteran Brad Morris in Australia at Brace For War 6 on November 13, but he pulled out of the fight due to travel issues. He was replaced by Josh Ogilvie.

On January 20, 2012, Scherner entered WCFC: Last Man Standing 2, a 16 fighter, last-man-standing style MMA tournament. After winning his first fight, Scherner lost to the tournament winner Tyler East, in the final and main event.

On August 4, 2012, Scherner faced Anthony "Freight Train" Hamilton at SportFight 31. After connecting with a right and dropping him to the canvas, Scherner continued to throw strikes until Hamilton gave up his neck and Scherner was able to finish with an arm triangle choke, providing Hamilton with his only defeat via submission.

Less than 2 months later, on September 17, 2012, Scherner faced against the much younger Vitaly Minakov, losing via TKO (punches) late in the first round of the main event.

Championships and accomplishments
International Sport Karate Association
ISKA MMA Americas Heavyweight Championship (One time)
Submission Underground - SUG
Submission Underground 7 Winner

Mixed martial arts record

|-
| Loss
| align=center| 11–11 (3)
| Tony Lopez
| TKO (punches)
| KOTC: Fight to the Finish
| 
| align=center| 3
| align=center| 1:11
| Lincoln City, Oregon, United States
| 
|-
| Win
| align=center| 11–10 (3)
| D.J. Linderman
| TKO (punches)
| KOTC: Wipeout
| 
| align=center| 1
| align=center| 2:55
| Lincoln City, Oregon, United States
| 
|-
| Loss
| align=center| 10–10 (3)
| Vitaly Minakov
| KO (punches)
| Fight Nights: Battle of Desne
| 
| align=center| 1
| align=center| 3:51
| Bryansk, Bryansk Oblast, Russia
| 
|-
| Win
| align=center| 10–9 (3)
| Anthony Hamilton
| Submission (arm-triangle choke)
| SportFight 31: Battle at the Bay 2
| 
| align=center| 1
| align=center| 2:02
| Manson, Washington, United States
| 
|-
| Loss
| align=center| 9–9 (3)
| Tyler East
| KO (punches)
| WCFC: Last Man Standing 2
| 
| align=center| 1
| align=center| 0:36
| Orem, Utah, United States
| 
|-
| Win
| align=center| 9–8 (3)
| Andenilson Clementino
| TKO (punches)
| WCFC: Last Man Standing 2
| 
| align=center| 1
| align=center| 2:12
| Orem, Utah, United States
| 
|-
| NC
| align=center| 8–8 (3)
| Scott Junk
| NC (accidental kick to the groin)
| Galaxy MMA 1: Worlds Collide
| 
| align=center| 1
| align=center| 0:27
| Honolulu, Hawaii, United States
| 
|-
| Loss
| align=center| 8–8 (2)
| Mike Hayes
| KO (punch)
| ROTR 6: Final Countdown
| 
| align=center| 2
| align=center| 3:50
| Snoqualmie, Washington, United States
| 
|-
| Win
| align=center| 8–7 (2)
| Nick Braker
| Submission (rear-naked choke)
| CATC 6: Carnage at the Creek 6
| 
| align=center| 1
| align=center| 3:08
| Shelton, Washington, United States
| 
|-
| Loss
| align=center| 7–7 (2)
| Tracy Willis
| TKO (punches)
| Pro Battle MMA: Immediate Impact
| 
| align=center| 2
| align=center| 2:49
| Springdale United States
| 
|-
| Loss
| align=center| 7–6 (2)
| Mychal Clark
| Submission (punches)
| SF 23: SportFight 23
| 
| align=center| 2
| align=center| 3:51
| Portland, United States
| 
|-
| Loss
| align=center| 7–5 (2)
| Roy Nelson
| TKO (punches)
| IFL: Las Vegas
| 
| align=center| 1
| align=center| 3:20
| Las Vegas, Nevada, United States
| 
|-
| Win
| align=center| 7–4 (2)
| Dierley Buga
| TKO (punches)
| SFC 3: Sul Fighting Championship 3
| 
| align=center| 1
| align=center| N/A
| Brazil
| 
|-
| NC
| align=center| 6–4 (2)
| Maiquel Falcão
| NC (cut from an illegal headbutt)
| Desafio: Fight Show
| 
| align=center| 1
| align=center| N/A
| Brazil
| 
|-
| Win
| align=center| 6–4 (1)
| Marcelo Barbosa
| KO (punch)
| SS: Storm Samurai
| 
| align=center| 1
| align=center| N/A
| Brazil
| 
|-
| Loss
| align=center| 5–4 (1)
| Gilbert Yvel
| TKO (punches)
| Cage Rage 17
| 
| align=center| 1
| align=center| 1:30
| London, England
| 
|-
| Loss
| align=center| 5–3 (1)
| Gabriel Gonzaga
| TKO (punches)
| UFC 60: Hughes vs. Gracie
| 
| align=center| 2
| align=center| 0:24
| Los Angeles, California, United States
| 
|-
| Loss
| align=center| 5–2 (1)
| Brandon Vera
| TKO (knees and punches)
| UFC Ultimate Fight Night 2
| 
| align=center| 2
| align=center| 3:22
| Las Vegas, Nevada, United States
| 
|-
| Win
| align=center| 5–1 (1)
| Aaron Brink
| Submission (guillotine choke)
| IFC: Rock N' Rumble
| 
| align=center| 1
| align=center| 0:50
| Nevada, United States
| 
|-
| Win
| align=center| 4–1 (1)
| Brian Stromberg
| Submission (guillotine choke)
| SF 11: Rumble at the Rose Garden
| 
| align=center| 1
| align=center| 1:13
| Oregon, United States
| 
|-
| Win
| align=center| 3–1 (1)
| Sebastian Rodriguez
| Submission (armbar)
| SF 10: Mayhem
| 
| align=center| 1
| align=center| 2:35
| Oregon, United States
| 
|-
| Win
| align=center| 2–1 (1)
| Demian Decorah
| Submission (armbar)
| FCC 19: Freestyle Combat Challenge 19
| 
| align=center| N/A
| align=center| N/A
| Wisconsin, United States
| 
|-
| Loss
| align=center| 1–1 (1)
| Assuerio Silva
| Submission (guillotine choke)
| Jungle Fight 2
| 
| align=center| 2
| align=center| N/A
| Manaus, Brazil
| 
|-
| NC
| align=center| 1–0 (1)
| Assuerio Silva
| NC (injury)
| Meca 9: Meca World Vale Tudo 9
| 
| align=center| 1
| align=center| 3:23
| Rio de Janeiro, Brazil
| 
|-
| Win
| align=center| 1–0
| Scott Bowman
| TKO (punches)
| HOOKnSHOOT: Absolute Fighting Championships 3
| 
| align=center| 1
| align=center| 2:35
| Florida, United States
|

References

External links

 

Living people
1972 births
Brazilian male mixed martial artists
Heavyweight mixed martial artists
Mixed martial artists utilizing Brazilian jiu-jitsu
Brazilian practitioners of Brazilian jiu-jitsu
People awarded a black belt in Brazilian jiu-jitsu
Sportspeople from Rio de Janeiro (city)
Brazilian people of German descent
Ultimate Fighting Championship male fighters